Josef Joffe (born 15 March 1944) is a former publisher-editor of Die Zeit, a weekly German newspaper. His second career has been in academia. Appointed Senior Fellow of Stanford's Freeman Spogli Institute for International Studies in 2007 (a faculty position), he is also the Marc and Anita Abramowitz Fellow in International Relations at the Hoover Institution and a courtesy professor of political science at Stanford University. Since 1999, he has been an associate of the Olin Institute for Strategic Studies at Harvard University.

Life
Joffe was born into the Jewish Joffe family in Litzmannstadt, Wartheland, Nazi Germany (now Łódź, Poland) and grew up in West Berlin, where he attended elementary school and gymnasium. He then came to the United States in 1961 as an exchange student, attending East Grand Rapids High School in Grand Rapids, Michigan. He attended Swarthmore College, graduating in 1965, obtained a postgraduate Certificate of Advanced European Studies from the College of Europe in 1966 and an M.A. from Johns Hopkins University's School of Advanced International Studies. He received a Ph.D. in government from Harvard University in 1975.

In 1976 Joffe started his career with Die Zeit as a political writer and grew into managing the Zeit Dossier department, an important and often lengthy part of this newspaper which elaborates a single topic on several pages.

From 1982 to 1984 he was a professorial lecturer at Johns Hopkins University's Paul H. Nitze School of Advanced International Studies, and from 1985 to 2000 he was columnist and editorial page editor for Süddeutsche Zeitung. In 1990 and 1991 he taught at Harvard University, in 1998 he was a visiting lecturer at Princeton University's Woodrow Wilson School of Public and International Affairs, and in 2002 he was a visiting lecturer at Dartmouth College. He has also taught at the University of Munich and the Salzburg Seminar.

In 2005, Joffe founded, together with Zbigniew Brzezinski, Eliot Cohen and Francis Fukuyama, The American Interest, a magazine where both American and international authors think and argue about the United States and its role in the world. Joffe's essays and reviews have appeared in a wide number of publications including Commentary, The New Republic, The New York Review of Books, The New York Times Magazine, Prospect, The European Journal of International Affairs, The Times Literary Supplement, and The Weekly Standard. His scholarly work has appeared in many books and in journals, including Foreign Affairs, Foreign Policy, International Security, The National Interest and The American Interest.

Topics and standpoints

International politics in relation with Germany's position in the world has been a preferred subject for Joffe.

Joffe's 1984 article in Foreign Policy, entitled "Europe's American Pacifier," is the source of the common international relations term of art "the American pacifier." The piece presents the argument that the preponderant power of the United States (in this case, projected into Europe) acts as a pacifying force in the region, preventing the region's multipolarity from leading to conflict.

Joffe is known for his global warming scepticism. He has described Al Gore as the "priest" of a (climate related) "secular religion".

Honors

Joffe has received the Theodor Wolff Prize in journalism, the Ludwig Börne Prize in essays and literature, and the German Federal Order of Merit. He has also been awarded honorary doctoral degrees from Swarthmore College (2002) and Lewis and Clark College (2005). He received the Scopus Award in 2009.

References

Selected books

External links 

 Biography
 Prospect magazine Archive of articles written by Joffe.
 The New York Review of Books
 

1944 births
Living people
Journalists from Berlin
20th-century German newspaper publishers (people)
21st-century German newspaper publishers (people)
German magazine founders
Princeton University faculty
Harvard University staff
Stanford University Department of Political Science faculty
Dartmouth College faculty
Johns Hopkins University faculty
Harvard University alumni
Paul H. Nitze School of Advanced International Studies alumni
College of Europe alumni
Swarthmore College alumni
Officers Crosses of the Order of Merit of the Federal Republic of Germany
German expatriates in the United States
German people of Polish-Jewish descent
German male non-fiction writers
Die Zeit editors